The Château des Magnans is a château in Jausiers, Alpes-de-Haute-Provence, Provence-Alpes-Côte d'Azur, France. It was built from 1903 to 1913 for Louis Fortoul, a French businessman who founded the department store chain Fábricas de Francia in Guadalajara, Mexico. It has been listed as an official historical monument since 1986.

Residence 
The château is now a 3-star tourism residence, with 63 flats on site (14 within the château itself) equipped with a panoramic swimming pool, a solarium, an indoor spa and a jacuzzi.

References

Houses completed in 1913
Châteaux in Alpes-de-Haute-Provence
Monuments historiques of Provence-Alpes-Côte d'Azur
20th-century architecture in France